U.S.–Japan Status of Forces Agreement (formally, the "Agreement under Article VI of the Treaty of Mutual Cooperation and Security between Japan and the United States of America, Regarding Facilities and Areas and the Status of United States Armed Forces in Japan") is an agreement between Japan and the United States signed on 19 January 1960 in Washington, the same day as the revised U.S.-Japan Security Treaty. It is a status of forces agreement (SOFA) as stipulated in article VI of that treaty, which referred to "a separate agreement" governing the "use of [...] facilities and areas [granted to the U.S.] as well as the status of United States armed forces in Japan". It replaced the earlier "U.S.-Japan Administrative Agreement" that governed such issues under the original 1951 security treaty.

The SOFA has become a major political issue following instances of violent crimes allegedly committed by servicemembers. Although the Japanese court system has jurisdiction for most crimes committed by American servicemembers in Japan, there are exceptions if the American was "acting in official duty," or if the victim was another American.  In those cases the American system has jurisdiction, unless it is voluntarily waived.

Additionally, some idiosyncrasies of the agreement create areas of perceived privilege for American servicemembers.  For instance, because the SOFA exempts most U.S. military members from Japanese visa and passport laws, past incidents occurred in which U.S. military members were transferred back to the U.S. before facing charges in Japanese courts.  Furthermore, the agreement requires that if a U.S. servicemember is suspected of a crime but is not captured outside of a base by the Japanese authorities, the U.S. authorities are to retain custody until the servicemember is formally indicted by the Japanese. Although the agreement also requires U.S. cooperation with Japanese authorities with investigations, the Japanese authorities often object that they still do not have regular access to question or interrogate U.S. servicemembers, making it difficult for Japanese prosecutors to prepare cases for indictment.  This is exacerbated by the unique nature of Japanese pre-indictment interrogations, which are focused on eliciting a confession as a prerequisite for indictment, are often conducted without a lawyer, and can last as long as 23 days.  Given the difference between this interrogation system and the system in the U.S., the U.S. has argued that the extraterritoriality granted its military members under the SOFA is necessary to afford them the same rights that exist under the U.S. criminal justice system.  However, since the 1995 Okinawan rape incident, the U.S. has agreed to favorably consider handing over suspects in serious cases such as rape and murder before they have been charged. On 16 January 2017, Japan and the U.S. "signed a supplementary agreement to limit and clarify the definition of the civilian component protected under the Status of Forces Agreement." This agreement came after the 2016 rape and murder of an Okinawa woman, allegedly by a civilian contract worker employed at the U.S. Kadena Air Base in Okinawa Prefecture.

See also 
Omoiyari Yosan
Girard Incident
1995 Okinawan rape incident
Michael Brown Okinawa assault incident
Extraterritoriality
Japan–United States relations

References

Full text 
 

Japan–United States military relations
Crime in Japan
United States military in Japan
1960 in Japan
1960 in the United States
Foreign relations of Post-war Japan
Treaties concluded in 1960
Treaties entered into force in 1960
United States Armed Forces in Okinawa Prefecture
Law of Japan